Bidard is a French surname. Notable people with the surname include:

Dominique Bidard (born 1955), French weightlifter
François Bidard (born 1992), French cyclist
Théophile Bidard (1804–1877), French politician and law professor

French-language surnames